A proctor is an overseer or representative in a legal, ecclesiastical or academic setting. It may also refer to:

People
 Proctor (surname), includes a list of people with the name

Place names
In the United States:
Proctor, Kentucky
Proctor, Minnesota
Proctor, Missouri
Proctor, Pennsylvania
Proctor, Oklahoma
Proctor, Texas
Proctor, Vermont, a New England town
Proctor (CDP), Vermont, the village within the town
Proctor, West Virginia

Schools
Proctor Academy, a boarding school in Andover, New Hampshire, USA
Proctor High School, a secondary school in Proctor, Minnesota, USA

Other uses 
 Percival Proctor, a British radio trainer and communications aircraft of the Second World War and after
 Proctor (lunar crater)
 Proctor (Martian crater)
 a barley (Hordeum vulgare) cultivar

See also
 Procter (surname)
 Procter & Gamble